Abdelilah Galal (born 20 January 1986) is an Egyptian footballer.

Career
Galal currently plays at the club level for the Arab Contractors.

He also played for the Egypt national football team at the 2005 FIFA World Youth Championship in The Netherlands.

References

1986 births
Living people
Egyptian footballers
Al Ahly SC players
Association football defenders
Egyptian Premier League players